Kristóf Szűcs (born 3 January 1997) is a Hungarian footballer who plays as a right back for Ajka.

Career
Szucs played at the academy for Budapest Honved before moving to the academy at city neighbours Ujpest. On February 26, 2017, Szűcs made his Hungarian League debut for Újpest FC coming on as a substitute and scoring in the 90th minute against Szombathelyi Haladás. With Ujpest he won the 2017–18 Magyar Kupa beating Puskás Akadémia FC in the Groupama Arena, Budapest, on penalties after a 2-2 draw. In 2019 he went on loan to Vác FC to gain experience in the division below, and then a further loan followed in 2020 to FC Ajka. A third season on loan at Ajka in the Hungarian National Championship II was confirmed in 2022.

Club statistics

Updated to games played as of 19 May 2019.

References

External links

1997 births
People from Szeged
Living people
Hungarian footballers
Association football defenders
Újpest FC players
Vác FC players
FC Ajka players
Nemzeti Bajnokság I players
Nemzeti Bajnokság II players